The Steppe March (Russian: Степной поход) was a successful military withdrawal by the Don Cossacks in Spring 1918, towards the steppe around the Sal River, to ensure their survival under attack from the Red Army.

In January–February 1918, the Red Army had conducted the successful Donbass-Don Operation in which Rostov-on-Don was occupied on February 23, and the Cossack capital Novocherkassk on February 25. The Don Cossack Ataman Alexei Kaledin committed suicide on 11 February 1918.

The Volunteer Army under the command of Generals Mikhail Alekseev and General Lavr Kornilov retreated during the Ice March to the Kuban. Field Ataman Popov's Don Cossacks didn't want to leave the Don and instead departed toward the river Sal on 26 February. Popov's force included 1500 Cossacks, five guns, and 40 machine guns. On 23 April, Popov's force, now diminished to 1000, linked up with K. S. Poliakov's Zaplavskaia army at Konstantinovskaia. From the combined force, Popov organized Southern, Northern and Trans-Don army groups, under S. V. Denisov, Semiletov, and Semenov respectively. On 6 May, the Southern group helped capture Novocherkassk, which coincided with the German advance, and the arrival of Mikhail Drozdovsky's men from Romania.

References

History of the Don Cossacks
Russian Civil War
White movement
Battles of the Russian Civil War
History of Donetsk Oblast
May 1918 events
April 1918 events
March 1918 events
February 1918 events